Chebarkul is a town in Chelyabinsk Oblast, Russia, located on the shores of Lake Chebarkul,  west of Chelyabinsk, the administrative center of the oblast. Population:

Etymology
The name of the town derives from the Bashkir/Tatar words meaning "a particolored lake".

History
Founded in 1736 as a fortress on the border between Russian and Bashkir lands, it later grew into a large Cossack stanitsa. The fortress was founded with the permission of Bashkir Tarkhan Taymas Shaimov, who was the owner of these lands. Town status was granted to it on October 25, 1951.

2013 meteor event

Administrative and municipal status
Within the framework of administrative divisions, Chebarkul serves as the administrative center of Chebarkulsky District, even though it is not a part of it. As a municipal division, the Town of Chebarkul is incorporated as Chebarkulsky Urban Okrug.

References

Notes

Sources

External links

Official website of Chebarkul 
Chebarkul Business Directory 

Cities and towns in Chelyabinsk Oblast